Chakka may refer to: 

 Jack fruit in the Malayalam language
 Strained yogurt in India and Pakistan